Samonikli (trans. The Indigenous Ones) were a Yugoslav rock band formed in Belgrade in 1964. Despite having no official releases, the band made a number of recordings for Yugoslav radio and television and are notable as one of the pioneers of the Yugoslav rock scene.

History

1964-1969
The band Samonikli was formed in 1964. They chose their name after a book of short stories by Slovene writer Prežihov Voranc. Initially, the band held rehearsals at the Center for Culture and Arts Nikola Tesla. Group members changed frequently in the early period, but by 1966 they stabilized in the following lineup: Marin Pečjak (vocals), Milan Pavlov (guitar), Marko Novaković (bass guitar), Bojan Drndić (rhythm guitar) and Vukašin Veljković (drums).

Initially the band performed at school and college dances. The band covered rock hits, as well as traditional songs and 1930s and 1940s schlagers, often introducing elements of jazz into these covers, while their own songs were mostly The Shadows-inspired instrumentals. In 1965 and 1966 they played regularly at dances at Belgrade Faculty of Technology and Cultural Center Vuk Karadžić and soon became widely popular. Their performances at the Faculty of Technology were usually visited by 700 to 800 young people.

In 1966 they were chosen by the Belgrade City Committee of the League of Socialist Youth of Serbia to represent Yugoslavia at an international festival of youth orchestras in Hungary. Samonikli performed alongside well-known Eastern European groups, such as Illés, Metró, Omega, and others, themselves being viewed as a "Western" group. At the end of 1966, they were joined by the drummer Branislav Grujić, a former member of Smeli (The Brave Ones). The band recorded several songs for Radio Belgrade. For the recording of the songs "Dozvoljavate li gospodine" ("Do You Allow, Sir") and "Povetarac i ja" ("The Breeze and I"), the latter of which became a hit on a popular Radio Belgrade music program called Muzički automat (Music Automaton), the band worked with six violinists, being one of the rare Yugoslav bands at the time to include bowed string instruments into their sound. Their recordings were featured in many popular radio programs, most notably Nedeljom u devet i pet (Sunday at 9:05).  They were featured in a very popular series of shows on Television Belgrade called Koncert za ludi mladi svet (Concert for a Young and Crazy World) twice, with the songs "Viđaju te s njim" ("They're Seeing You with Him") and "Da li vidiš" ("Can You See").

However, in the late 1960s the audience's interest for their performances faded and the press described their sound as archaic. Pečjak left Samonikli, so the band turned towards polyphonic singing, and the group changed eight different drummers. They moved towards more contemporary repertoire, adding an organist to the band and including covers of The Jimi Hendrix Experience and other contemporary acts' songs into the set list. In interviews, the band announced that they are working on the songs for their first official release; however, their efforts failed, and the band disbanded in 1969.

Reunions
In December 1985, Samonikli reunited to play in Belgrade's Trade Union Hall, along with many other popular 1960s groups, at a commemorative concert marking the 25th anniversary of rock music in Belgrade. In 2003, marking their 40th anniversary, Samonikli held a dance concert for their friends and fans at the Duga club in Belgrade, returning to their instrumental music. In 2005 and 2006 they held two dance concerts for their fans in Belgrade's Park restaurant.

Recordings
Although featured in radio and television shows, none of Samonikli recordings was ever officially released on vinyl record or any other format.
"Povetarac i ja" ("The Breeze and I", Radio Belgrade)
"Dozvoljavate li gospodine" ("Do You Allow, Sir", Radio Belgrade)
"Usamljena gitara" ("Lonely Guitar", Radio Belgrade)
"Ne ustupam vam svoje mesto" ("I Won't Give You My Seat", Radio Belgrade)
"Gde su ruže nestale" ("Where Did All the Roses Go", Radio Belgrade)
"Massachusetts" (Radio Belgrade)
"Mene moja nana" ("My Mom", Radio Belgrade)
"Izgubljena ljubav" ("Lost Love", Radio Belgrade)
"Budi se Istok i Zapad" ("The East and West Awaken", Radio Belgrade)
"Heroj Tito" ("Hero Tito", Radio Belgrade)
"Napisao sam volim te u pesku" ("I Wrote I Love You in the Sand", TV Belgrade)
"Takav čovek" ("That Sort of Man", TV Belgrade)
"Viđaju te s njim" ("They're Seeing You with Him", TV Belgrade)
"Da li vidiš" ("Can You See", TV Belgrade)

References

Serbian rock music groups
Serbian folk rock groups
Yugoslav rock music groups
Beat groups
Instrumental rock musical groups
Musical groups from Belgrade
Musical groups established in 1963
Musical groups disestablished in 1969